Advances in Parasitology is an annual book series of reviews addressing topics in parasitology, for both human and veterinary medicine. It is currently published by Academic Press and is abstracted and indexed in MEDLINE.

Review journals
Parasitology journals
Academic Press academic journals
Publications established in 1963
English-language journals